The Ashburnham Pentateuch (Paris, Bibliothèque Nationale de France, MS nouv. acq. lat. 2334, also known as the Tours Pentateuch and the Codex Turonensis) is a late 6th- or early 7th-century Latin illuminated manuscript of the Pentateuch (the first five books of the Old Testament). Although it originally contained all five books of the Pentateuch, it is now missing the whole of Deuteronomy as well as sections of the other five books.

It has 142 folios and 19 miniatures, and measures 372mm by 321mm. It is thought to have originally included as many as 68 full page miniatures. A full page table containing the Latin names of the books and Latin transliterations of the Hebrew names serves as a front piece to Genesis. The table is enclosed within a curtained arch. Some of the full page miniatures, such as that containing the miniature of Noah's Ark (folio 9r), contain a single scene. Other full page miniatures, such as that telling the story of Cain and Abel, contain many scenes which are placed in a register, with each scene having a different color background.

The origin of this manuscript is uncertain. Although it has been described by some scholars as Spanish, it may have come from North Africa, Syria or Italy.

The miniatures were used as the source of a later cycle of wall-paintings at the church of St Julian in Tours. The manuscript was at the Library of Tours before being stolen in 1842 by Guglielmo Libri Carucci dalla Sommaja and sold to Bertram Ashburnham, 4th Earl of Ashburnham in 1847. Since 1888, it has been housed at the National Library of France in Paris after its restitution by the heirs of Lord Ashburnham.

It is richly decorated with 18 full-page miniatures (remains of the original 69) illustrating scenes from the Genesis and Exodus biblical books. Its production has been assigned on stylistic base to Spain, Northern Africa or Italy. The miniatures of the Pentateuch have been analysed in non-invasive way in order to characterise its palette and to compare it with those of other early medieval manuscripts. The results of this investigation highlighted the wide use of the pigment Egyptian blue, an unusual feature in miniature painting.

References

 Calkins, Robert G. Illuminated Books of the Middle Ages. Ithaca, New York: Cornell University Press, 1983.
 Walther, Ingo F. and Norbert Wolf. Codices Illustres: The world's most famous illuminated manuscripts, 400 to 1600. Köln, TASCHEN, 2005.
 Weitzmann, Kurt. Late Antique and Early Christian Book Illumination. New York: George Braziller, 1977.

Further reading
Weitzmann, Kurt, ed., Age of spirituality: late antique and early Christian art, third to seventh century, no. 422, 1979, Metropolitan Museum of Art, New York, 
 Verkerk, Dorothy. Early Medieval Bible Illumination and the Ashburnham Pentateuch. Cambridge: Cambridge University Press, 2004.
 Verkerk, Dorothy. "Exodus and Easter Vigil in the Ashburnham Pentateuch," Art Bulletin LXXVII/1 (1995): 94–105.

External links

Digitised facsimile on Gallica
More information at Earlier Latin Manuscripts

6th-century biblical manuscripts
7th-century biblical manuscripts
6th-century illuminated manuscripts
7th-century illuminated manuscripts
Bible versions and translations
Illuminated biblical manuscripts
Bibliothèque nationale de France collections